The Lüneburg Heath Wildlife Park is a wildlife park near Nindorf in the municipality of Hanstedt in the north German state of Lower Saxony. The park is open all year.

Attractions 
The park specializes in animal species from the northern hemisphere, such as the grey wolf, Arctic wolf, brown bear, Kodiak bear, lynx, elk, red deer, reindeer, moose, sika deer, ibex, chamois and wild boar.

Siberian tigers
Two Siberian tigers, Alex and Ronja, live in a  naturalistic exhibit that opened in June 2010. The exhibit includes a rocky outcrop for the tigers to climb on, and ponds to swim in. Visitors can view the tigers through a  security fence that includes sections of bulletproof glass for better viewing.

Petting zoo
The petting zoo includes goats and deer, and children of all ages can pet and feed the animals.

Conservation 
The park participates in international wildlife conservation programmes for otters, red-crowned cranes, white-tailed eagles, snow leopards, muskoxen, mink and European bison.

Education 

From April to October, the park has educational presentations including "The animal my friend", which highlights the ability of birds of prey and other animals to learn, "Hunters of the air", in which falconers show the speed and agility of eagles, falcons, and vultures in the air, and "Faszination Wolf", a lecture about the forefathers of our domesticated dogs at the wolf enclosure, and otter feedings.

The Lüneburg Heath Wildlife Park hosted the zoo documentary series, Weiches Fell und scharfe Krallen ("Soft fur, sharp claws"), produced by the German TV company, NDR. On 10 April 2007 it started its own series: Wolf, Bär & Co ("Wolf, Bear and Co.").

Guided tours are offered to school classes free of charge.

Notes

References 
 Eckard Gehm: Schneeleopard (Uncia uncia). Geist der Berge. Publishing house Wildpark Lüneburger Heide, Hanstedt-Nindorf 1. edition 2002.  (German/English)
 Wildpark Lüneburger Heide (Hrsg.): Wildparkführer. Wildlife Park Guide. 40 Jahre Wildpark. Zooführer. Nindorf o.J. (2010/2011). (German)

External links 

 

Zoos in Germany
Geography of Lower Saxony
Tourist attractions in Lower Saxony
Zoos established in 1970
1970 establishments in West Germany
Wildlife parks